The Ford Wyoming Center (formerly known as the Casper Events Center) is a multi-purpose arena in Casper, Wyoming, in the United States. The arena was built in April 1982. It seats 8,395 for ice hockey and indoor football games, 8,842 for basketball games, and up to 9,700 for concerts.

It serves as the host of the College National Finals Rodeo in June and is also currently the home of Broadway in Casper theatre series. It has also hosted amateur wrestling tournaments and UFC 6.

It was home to the Wyoming Cavalry arena football team until 2014, Casper Coyotes hockey team and the Wyoming Wildcatters of the Continental Basketball Association.

On January 7, 2021, it was announced that the Wyoming Ford dealerships had purchased the naming rights to the arena for up to six years.

References

External links
Ford Wyoming Center

Basketball venues in Wyoming
Buildings and structures in Casper, Wyoming
Continental Basketball Association venues
Indoor arenas in Wyoming
Indoor ice hockey venues in Wyoming
Mixed martial arts venues in the United States
Rodeo venues in the United States
Sports venues completed in 1982
Tourist attractions in Casper, Wyoming
Wrestling venues in Wyoming
Wyoming Cavalry
Wyoming Wildcatters
1982 establishments in Wyoming
Sports in Casper, Wyoming